Ormond Henry John Saunders (29 June 1907 – 22 June 1978) was an  Australian rules footballer who played with North Melbourne in the Victorian Football League (VFL).

Notes

External links 

1907 births
1978 deaths
Australian rules footballers from Melbourne
North Melbourne Football Club players
People from Dandenong, Victoria